Sierra Point is the name of several locations:

Sierra Point, Brisbane, California, a small peninsula in Brisbane, California
Sierra Point (Yosemite), a hiking trail and vista in Yosemite National Park